Troth may refer to:

 An alternate form of truth, especially in the medieval sense
Troth (surname)
 Troth Yeddha', a landform in the Fairbanks North Star Borough, Alaska
 The Troth, an American Asatru organization
Troth's Fortune, a historic home in Easton, Maryland, United States